Khadeeja Mumthas (born 1955) is a Malayalam author from Kerala state, India. She is a medical doctor by profession and is probably best known in the Kerala literary circles for her second novel Barsa which won the Kerala Sahitya Akademi Award in 2010.

Early and personal life 
Born in Kattoor in Thrissur district, Khadeeja Mumthas completed her Pre-degree course (PDC) from St. Joseph's College, Irinjalakuda and received her MBBS degree from Calicut Medical College. She mastered in gynaecology and is a registered medical practitioner and has been working in Calicut Medical College as Professor in gynaecology and obstetrics. She applied for voluntary retirement from government service in June 2013 to protest against her transfer from Calicut Medical College at the fag end of her service. She is presently the Vice Chairman of Kerala Sahithya Akademy and is also selected as one of the Academic council member, Thunchathezhuthachan Malayalam university, Tirur, Kerala. She is also a visiting professor in O&G, Malabar Medical College, Modakkallur, Kozhikode.

Literary career 
Mumtaz started her literary career with Athmatheerthangalil Munginivarnnu, which was first published as a serial novel in Chandrika weekly and later as a book by Current Books in 2004. Mumtaz rose to fame with her novel Barsa (2007), which was a great critical and popular success. The book, which won critical acclaim for its forceful but humorous presentation of the restrictions under which Muslim women are forced to live, was hailed a milestone in Malayalam literature. It won the prestigious Kerala Sahitya Akademi Award for the year 2010. Mumtaz's next novel, Athuram, released on 28 January 2011 at the 12th International Book Festival in Kochi, also received rave reviews from critics. According to renowned writer U. A. Khader, this novel, after her acclaimed Barsa, was sure to trigger off a diverse kind of reading and interpretations as it passionately dealt with a sphere closer to Dr. Mumthas by her own experience as a medical practitioner. "The unique style of narration that develops through the inner conflicts of characters is sure to compel the readers' attention throughout the work," he said.

In 2012, she published a collection of essays on gynaecology titled Mathrukam. She has also published a collection of her memoirs as a doctor under the title Doctor Daivamalla. She is also a notable columnist writing articles in various magazines.

Bibliography 
 Athmatheerthangalil Munginivarnnu (Novel, Current Books, Thrissur, 2004)
 Barsa (Novel, DC Books, Kottayam, 2007)  Translated to English ,Tamil & Kannada 
 Doctor Daivamalla (Memoirs, DC Books, Kottayam, 2009)
 Athuram (Novel, DC Books, Kottayam, 2010)
 Sargam, Samooham (Essays, Bookpoint, Kozhikode, 2011)
 Balyathil Ninnu Irangi Vanna Oral (Short stories, Piano Publications, Kozhikode, 2011)
 Mathrukam (Scientific literature, DC Books, Kottayam, 2012)
 Purushanariyatha Sthreemukhangal (Essays, Mathrubhumi Books, Kozhikode, 2012)
 Pirakkum munbe karuthalode (Science fiction, Current Books , Thrissur, 2013)
 Neettiyezhuthukal  (Novel, DC Books, Kottayam, 2017)
 Naam Jeevitham Chuttedukkunnavar (Short Stories, Granma Books , Kozhikode, 2017)
 Khayalat (Articles, Space Kerala Publications , Kozhikode, 2017)
 Pranayam, Laingigatha, Sthree vimochanam (Articles, Olive Publications , Kozhikode, 2018)

Awards 
 2008: K. V. Surendranath Literary Award for Barsa
 2010: Kerala Sahitya Akademi Award for Barsa
 2010: Cherukad Award for Barsa
 2018: Thrissur Sahithya Vedi Award for Neettiyezhuthukal

References

External links 

1955 births
Living people
Malayali people
Indian women essayists
21st-century Indian Muslims
Indian gynaecologists
Indian women gynaecologists
20th-century Indian women scientists
21st-century Indian medical doctors
20th-century Indian medical doctors
Malayalam-language writers
Malayalam novelists
People from Thrissur district
21st-century Indian women writers
Recipients of the Kerala Sahitya Akademi Award
Indian women novelists
University of Calicut alumni
21st-century Indian novelists
21st-century Indian essayists
20th-century Indian women writers
20th-century Indian writers
21st-century Indian women scientists
Medical doctors from Kerala
Women writers from Kerala
Novelists from Kerala
Women scientists from Kerala
20th-century women physicians
21st-century women physicians